National Route 622 (N622) forms part of the Philippine highway network.  It is one of the national secondary roads with two non-contiguous sections, one which runs through the municipalities of Kawit and Noveleta in Cavite, while the other road runs through the municipality of Daet in Camarines Norte; both of these roads are located in Luzon island.

Route description

Cavite
In Cavite, N622 runs along the municipal boundary of Kawit and Noveleta as Noveleta–Rosario Diversion Road or EPZA Diversion Road. It runs between N62 and N64 (Antero Soriano Highway).

Camarines Norte
In Camarines Norte, N622 runs in the municipality of Daet, where the entire signed road is known as Daet Airport Road (also known as Ninoy Aquino Avenue and Bagasbas Road). Starting from Vinzons Avenue (Tagas-Daet Poblacion-Magang Road) at the town proper of Daet, it serves as an access road to the coastal barangay of Bagasbas and Daet Airport. The route ends at the intersection with President Cory C. Aquino (Bagasbas Boulevard) in Bagasbas, while Daet Airport Road continues southeast as an unnumbered route towards the airport of the same name.

References

External links 
 Department of Public Works and Highways

Roads in Cavite
Roads in Camarines Norte